Young's inequality may refer to:
 Young's inequality for products, bounding the product of two quantities
 Young's convolution inequality, bounding the convolution product of two functions
 Young's inequality for integral operators

See also
 William Henry Young, English mathematician (1863–1942)
 Hausdorff–Young inequality, bounding the coefficient of Fourier series